Ana Pupedan is a musical group from Pivka, Slovenia. The band was founded in 1992 by Simon Avsec (vocal, violin), Boštjan Požar (guitar, clarinet), Peter Žnidaršič (bass guitar), and Marko Doles (drums).

In the local Slovene dialect, "Ana Pupedan" means One in the afternoon, but many mistakenly believe that the band's name stands for a woman.

Discography
Anje Pupedanju (1995 KŠOPP, reissue 1998, Vinilmanija)
Ante prupagandni balar (1998, Vinilmanija)
Brez naslova (2001, self distribution)
Na domači brjači (2010, Založba Radia Študent (ZARŠ))

External links
anapupedan.com
Ana Pupedan MySpace
Ana Pupedan at Založba Radia Študent (ZARŠ)

Slovenian alternative rock groups
Musical groups established in 1992